Ovens Auditorium is an auditorium located adjacent to Bojangles' Coliseum, in Charlotte, North Carolina. Opened in 1955, Ovens has a seating capacity of 2,455 and has hosted over 7,500 events (as of April 2009). It is managed by the Charlotte Regional Visitors Authority. The auditorium underwent minor renovations in 2002, that resulted in ADA compliance, better acoustics and an upgrade of the sound system.

Concerts

Other events
Billy Graham Crusades played in late 1950s.
Wicked sold out for two straight weeks in 2008 becoming the first for straight sellouts.
High School and College Graduations have made Ovens Auditorium their home
Family Shows that have made their way to Ovens Auditorium include:
The Backyardigans
Disney Live
My Little Pony Live
Raggs
The Pout Pout Fish

Awards and recognitions
In 2008, Ovens Auditorium was named the #38 Top Theatre in the World by POLLSTAR.

External links
 
Ovens Auditorium
Ovens Auditorium Seating Chart

Buildings and structures in Charlotte, North Carolina
Culture of Charlotte, North Carolina
Concert halls in the United States
Tourist attractions in Charlotte, North Carolina
Music venues in North Carolina